The 2006 Georgia Bulldogs football team completed the season with a 9–4 record. The Bulldogs had an SEC record of 4–4. Despite losses to unranked Kentucky and Vanderbilt, Georgia salvaged its season by beating two ranked teams in the last two games of the season: #5 Auburn and #15 Georgia Tech. A victory over #14 Virginia Tech in the 2006 Chick-fil-A Bowl gave the Georgia Bulldogs three consecutive victories over top 25 teams. This was the team's sixth season under the guidance of head coach Mark Richt.

Preseason 
Following a 2005 campaign in which the Bulldogs finished the year ranked #10, the team was given a preseason #14 in the Coaches Poll.

Ten players were named to the 2006 SEC Media Days Pre-Season All-Conference Football Team. TE Martrez Milner, OT Daniel Inman, C Nick Jones, DE Quentin Moses and PK Brandon Coutu were selected as first-team members. LB Jarvis Jackson, DB Tra Battle and P Gordon Ely-Kelso were named to the second team and RB Thomas Brown and LB Tony Taylor to the third team.

Schedule

Rankings

Roster 
{| class="toccolours" style="border-collapse:collapse; font-size:90%;"
|-
|valign="top"|
Quarterbacks
 	7  	Stafford, Matthew	QB	Fr.
	13  	Tereshinski III, Joe	QB†	Sr.
	14  	Cox, Joe	QB	RFr.
	15  	Barnes, Blake	QB	So.
	16      Charles Stanford II QB
   17  	deLaureal, Jonathan	QB	Fr.

Running backs
 	6  	Lumpkin, Kregg	TB†	Jr.
	20  	Brown, Thomas	TB+	Jr.
	24  	Moreno, Knowshon	TB	Fr.
	28  	Ware, Danny	TB	Jr.
	39  	Johnson, Jason	TB	Jr.
	47  	Lane, Mitchell	TB	Fr.

Fullbacks
	33  	Thomason, Brett	FB	So.
	35  	Williams, Des	FB	Sr.
	36  	Southerland, Brannan	FB†	So.
	46  	White, Stephen	FB	Sr.
	48  	Munzenmaier, Fred	FB	Fr.
	49  	Chapas, Shaun	FB	Fr.
	98  	Taylor, Tripp	FB	Fr.

Tight ends
	81  Ward, NaDerris	TE	Fr.
	84  Watson, Coleman	TE	Jr.
	86  Chandler, Tripp	TE	So.
	87  Milner, Martrez	TE†	Sr.
	89  Holden, Trahern	TE	Sr.

Wide receivers
 	1  Massaquoi, Mohamed	SE†	So.
 	4  Bailey, Sean	FLK	Sr.
 	8  Spellman, Vernon	SE	RFr.
	11  Hearn, Hagan	WR	RSo.
	12  Croffie, Percie	WR	RJr.
	16  Durham, Kris	SE	Fr.
	18  Bryant, A.J.	FLK†	Jr.
	26  Wilson, Tony	WR	Fr.
	27  Henderson, Mikey	FLK	Jr.
	80  Raley, Mario	SE	Sr.
	82  Moore, Michael	FLK	RFr.
	83  Gartrell, T.J.	SE	Jr.
	85  Goodman, Demiko	SE	So.
	88  Harris, Kenneth	FLK	So.
|width="25"| 
|valign="top"|

Offensive Line
	61  Turner, Michael	TT	Sr.
	63  Davis, Chris	OL	Fr.
	63  Mitchell, Orry	C	So.
	64  Smith, Ian	C	RFr.
	67  Adams, Chester	TG†	Jr.
	68  Abbott, Chris	SG	Sr.
	69  Speight, Alex	OL	Fr.
	70  Jones, Nick		C†	Sr.
	72  Inman, Daniel	TT†	Sr.
	73  White, Micky	OL	Fr.
	74  Perez, Kevin	C	Fr.
	75  Velasco, Fernando	SG†	Jr.
	76  Watts, Seth	TG	So.
	77  McKinzey, Zeb	SG	Sr.
	78  Davis, Josh	OL	Fr.
	79  Shackleford, Ken	ST†	Sr.

Defensive Line				
	38  Howard, Marcus	DE	Jr.
	41  Battle, Roderick	DE	RFr.
       54  Dixon, Dale         DT      Sr.
	55  Lomax, Jeremy	DE	So.
	56  Atkins, Geno	DT	Fr.
       71  Lyles, Justin       DT      Jr.
	84  Nickels, Casey	DE	Fr.
       90  Gant, Ray       DT†     Sr.
	91  Weston, Kade	DT	RFr.
	94  Moses, Quentin	DE†	Sr.
	95  Owens, Jeff	DT†	So.
	96  Gully, Andrew	DE	RFr.
	99  Johnson, Charles	DE†	Jr.

Linebackers
	12  Miller, Brandon	SLB†	Jr.
	33  Ellerbe, Dannell	WLB	So.
	35  Pick, Matt	LB	Fr.
	37  Hebron, Akeem	LB	Fr.
	38  Moss, Taylor	LB	RJr.
	42  Verdun Wheeler, Danny	SLB	Sr.
	43  Taylor, Tony	WLB†	Sr.
	44  Washington, Marcus	MLB	So.
	45  Jackson, Jarvis	MLB†	Sr.
	48  Watkins, Tommy	WLB	RFr.
	49  Williams, Patrick	LB	RJr.
	50  Gamble, Darryl	LB	Fr.
	51  Dent, Akeem	LB	Fr.
	52  Dewberry, Darius	LB	Fr.
	53  Gaunder, Chris	WLB	Jr.
	57  Boyd, Benjamin	LB	So.
	60  Krauth, Charles	LB	So.
	65  Sullivan, Will	LB	Fr.
|width="25"| 
|valign="top"|
Defensive backs
 	2  Allen, Asher	SC	Fr.
 	3  Evans, Bryan	SC†	RFr.
 	5  Byrd, CJ	FS	So.
 	8  Oliver, Paul	WC†	Jr.
 	9  Jones, Reshad	DB	Fr.
	10  Baldwin, Donavon	ROV	RFr.
	11  Brown, Ramarcus	WC	So.
	15  Francis, Rowdy	FS	So.
	15  Pittman, Mitchell	FS	So.
	16  Gloer, Chad	DB	Fr.
	17  Coates, Antavious	FS	RFr.
	22  Gibson, DeMarcus	CB	Sr.
	22  Sims, Antonio	ROV	So.
	23  Miller, Prince	DB	Fr.
	25  Battle, Tra	ROV†	Sr.
	27  Williams, Taylor	DB	RFr.
	29  Flowers, Thomas	SC	Jr.
	30  Johnson, Kelin	FS†	Jr.
	31  Banks, Quintin	DB	Fr.
	32  O'Keefe, Joseph	ROV	Sr.
	47  Williams, Andrew	FS	Jr.
	xx  Johnson, Andrew	DB	Fr.

Punters
	26  	Mimbs, Brian	P	So.
	95  	Ely-Kelso, Gordon	P†	Sr.
	99  	Murphy, Erick	P	Fr.

Place Kickicers				
	22  	Stansell, Bo	PK	Fr.
	93  	Bailey, Andy	PK	Jr.
	96  	Coutu, Brandon	PK†	Jr.

Long snappers				
	59  	Fowler, Bo	SN	So.
	65  	Henson, Jeff	SN†	Jr.

Holders
	15  	Francis, Rowdy	H	So.
	26  	Mimbs, Brian	H†	So.

Punt Returners
 	2  	Allen, Asher	PR	Fr.
	29  Flowers, Thomas	PR	Jr.
	27  	Henderson, Mikey	PR†	Jr.

Kick Returners
 	2  	Allen, Asher	KR†	Fr.
	28  	Ware, Danny	KR	Jr.
|-
| colspan="5" valign="bottom" align="center" |Key
|-
| colspan="5" valign="bottom" align="left" |†Starter at position as of 7/10/2006
|- 
| colspan="5" valign="bottom" align="left" |Positions: C = Center; CB = Cornerback; DB = Defensive back; DE = Defensive end; DT = Defensive tackle; FB = Fullback; FLK = Flanker; FS = Free safety; H = Holder; KR = Kickoff returner; MLB = Middle linebacker; LB = Linebacker; OL = Offensive line; P = Punter; PK = Place kicker; PR = Punt returner; ROV = Rover; SC = Short corner; SE = Split end; SG = Split guard; SLB = Sam Linebacker; SN = Snapper; ST = Split tackle; TB = Tailback; TE = Tight end; TG = Tight guard; TT = Tight tackle; WLB = Will linebacker
|-
| colspan="5" valign="bottom" align="left" |Year'': Fr = Freshman; RFr = Redshirt Freshman; So = Sophomore; RSo = Redshirt Sophomore; Jr = Junior; Sr = Senior
|}

 Game summaries 
The prevalent theme throughout the 2006 season was the search for a starting quarterback for the Bulldogs.  Senior Joe Tereshinski III, redshirt freshman Joe Cox and true freshman Matthew Stafford all saw significant playing time during the season.

 WKU 

Source:

No line was established for this game.

Joe Tereshinski III started the game at quarterback for Georgia and completed 7 of 17 passes for 90 yards and a touchdown.  True freshman Matthew Stafford (3 of 5 passing; 40 yards and a touchdown) and redshirt freshman Joe Cox (2 of 3 passing; 29 yards and an interception) both saw playing time at quarterback.SEC Defensive Lineman of the Week:  Defensive end Quentin Moses for his performance against WKU which included 2.5 tackles for losses, one sack and three quarterback hurries.

 South Carolina 

Source:

The pre-game line established for this game was Georgia -1.5.

Joe Tereshinski started the game at quarterback and completed 2 of 3 passes for 18 yards.  However, he was injured on the opening drive of the game and was replaced by Matthew Stafford.  Stafford completed 8 of 19 passes for 171 yards and 3 interceptions, but South Carolina also had 3 costly fumbles of their own as well as a safety.SEC Defensive Player of the Week:  Defensive end Charles Johnson for his performance against South Carolina which included five tackles (four for losses), one sack, one safety, two quarterback pressures and one pass deflection.

 UAB 

Source:

The pre-game line established for this game was Georgia -10.

Matthew Stafford got his first career start at quarterback and completed 10 of 17 passes for 107 yards with no touchdowns or interception.  Joe Cox also saw brief action at quarterback late in the game.SEC Offensive Lineman of the Week:  Offensive guard Fernando Velasco for his performance against UAB which included a 90% grading and had two dominator blocks.

 Colorado 

Source:

The pre-game line established for this game was Georgia -16.

Getting his second start, Matthew Stafford and the offense struggled, completing 8 of 16 passes for 76 yards, with no touchdowns or interceptions, as Colorado jumped Georgia on their way to a 13–0 lead.  Stafford was replaced by Joe Cox, who rallied the team to victory in the fourth quarter, completing 10 of 13 passes for 154 yards and 2 touchdowns.  Cox found tight end Martrez Milner for a 20-yard touchdown with :46 left in the game, and Colorado QB Bernard Jackson was sacked on Colorado's last-ditch effort to win the game.SEC Freshman of the Week / Sporting News College Football Player of the Week: Redshirt freshman quarterback Joe Cox for his performance against Colorado in which he led the Bulldogs to a come-from-behind victory that was capped by a 20-yard touchdown pass with :46 on the clock.

 Ole Miss 

Source:

No line was established for this game.

Starting quarterback Joe Cox struggled (4 of 10 for 24 yards, no touchdowns or interceptions) and backup Matthew Stafford did not fare much better (7 for 18 for 91 yards, no touchdowns or interceptions).  Georgia's second half scores came on a pair of one yard runs by fullback Brannan Southerland.SEC Defensive Lineman Of The Week: Defensive end Charles Johnson for his performance against Ole Miss which included two sacks, one pass breakup and two third-down stops.  As of this week, Johnson was the conference leader with nine tackles for loss.

 Tennessee 

Source:

The pre-game line established for this game was Tennessee -2.5.

Georgia took advantage of Special teams play to jump out to a 24–7 lead in the 2nd quarter.  However, Tennessee stiffened its defense and scored on every possession but one in the second half to record a 51–33 victory over the ninth ranked Georgia Bulldogs.  Georgia entered the game with the #1 ranked scoring defense in the nation, but the Vols dropped them to #17.  Erik Ainge was 25-of-38 with 2 TD's and no interceptions.  Georgia scored twice on Special Teams, with an 85-yard punt return by Mikey Henderson in the first half and a 99-yard, school record tying kickoff return by Thomas Brown in the second half.  Tennessee DB Antonio Wardlow blocked and punt and recovered the ball in the endzone to post a TD for the Vols in the 2nd half.  Robert Meachem had 7 receptions for 98 yards and moved into first place nationally for receiving yards per game.  A photo of Wardlow's punt block and recovery made the cover of Sports Illustrated for October 16, 2006.

Kregg Lumpkin led the Bulldogs with 88 yards on 13 carries. Joe Tereshinski was 12-of-20 for 164 yards and 1 touchdown, while throwing 2 interceptions and losing a fumble.  Georgia was playing without starting kicker, Brandon Coutu, who injured his kicking on the Thursday before the game and was declared "out for the season."

 Vanderbilt 

Source:

The pre-game line established for this game was Georgia -14.5.

Both Joe Tereshinski and Matthew Stafford played at quarterback, but neither was able to guide the offense to a victory.  Tony Taylor's interception return for a touchdown gave Georgia a 22–21 lead late in the fourth quarter, but Vanderbilt got a short field goal from Bryant Hantfeldt as time expired for the 24–22 stunning upset. Georgia's loss caused the team to drop out of the top 25 for the first time since 2001.

 Mississippi State 

Source:

The pre-game line established for this game was Georgia -17.5.

Starting quarterback put together a nice game with his best offensive production of the year.  Still, Georgia had to stave off a late rally by Mississippi State to get the win.SEC Freshman of the Week: Freshman quarterback Matthew Stafford for his performance against Mississippi State in which he completed 20-of-32 passes for 267 yards and two touchdowns.

 Florida 

Source:

The pre-game line established for this game was Florida -13.

The 2006 edition of the Florida–Georgia football rivalry was won by Florida.  Matthew Stafford and the Georgia offense were ineffective in the first half and Florida lead 14–0 at halftime.  On the first play of the half, Georgia tailback Kregg Lumpkin fumbled the ball and Florida returned the fumble for a touchdown.  Stafford could not guide the Georgia offense to victory and he finished the day completing just 13 of 33 passing attempts for 151 yards, no touchdowns and 2 interceptions.  However, he did score on a 13-yard touchdown run in the third quarter.  After Kregg Lumpkin's 8 yard scoring run early in the fourth quarter, Georgia amazingly had a chance to send this game to overtime.  The eventual national champion Gators stiffened, however, and sent the Dawgs home with yet another loss in this series.  

 Kentucky 

Source:

The pre-game line established for this game was Georgia -7.

Hoping to rebound from its loss to Florida, Georgia went into the half leading 14–10.  The score did not change in the third quarter, but Kentucky outscored Georgia 14–6 in the fourth quarter to seal its victory.  Matthew Stafford's struggles continued as he completed 16 of 28 pass attempts for 230 yards with only one touchdown and 3 interceptions, including one in the final 2 minutes to seal the Wildcat victory.

 Auburn 

Source:

The pre-game line established for this game was Auburn -11.25.

Coming into the game with Auburn, Georgia's program seemed to be in shambles.  It had lost four of its last five games, including rare losses to Vanderbilt and Kentucky.  Georgia set the tone on their opening drive when Matthew Stafford found A.J. Bryant for a 53-yard gain down to the Auburn 8 yard line.  Kregg Lumpkin took it in from there, and Georgia never looked back.  Georgia seemed to reverse all of its ill fortunes in an explosive second quarter that saw them score 23 points and take a 30–7 lead into the lockers at halftime.  The second quarter featured contributions from both the offense and the defense: a 30-yard interception return for a touchdown by Tra Battle, a one-yard touchdown run by Brannan Southerland, a 14-yard touchdown pass from Stafford to Kregg Lumpkin and a 34-yard field goal by Gordon Ely-Kelso.Week 11 Cingular All-America Player of the Week Nominee / SEC Defensive Player of the Week / National Defensive Player Of The Week: Defensive back Tra Battle for his performance against Auburn which included three interceptions, one of which was returned by Battle for a touchdown.SEC Freshman of the Week: Freshman quarterback Matthew Stafford for his performance against Auburn in which he completed 14 of 20 passes for 219 yards and a touchdown and rushed for 83 yards on seven attempts with a touchdown.

 Georgia Tech 

Source:

The pre-game line established for this game was Georgia -3.

Facing its second top 25 team in as many outings, Georgia got off to a slow start, trailing at the half by 3–0.  Georgia opened up the scoring in the second half with a 29-yard fumble return by linebacker Tony Taylor.  The game wound up being a defensive struggle and Matthew Stafford put up modest numbers (16 of 29 for 171 yards, 1 touchdown and zero interceptions) and the Bulldogs were held to 84 yards rushing.  Georgia's defense shut down the Tech passing attack, limiting Tech quarterback Reggie Ball to 6 of 22 for 42 yards, no touchdowns and 2 interceptions.SEC Defensive Player of the Week''': Defensive back Paul Oliver for his performance against Georgia Tech in which he held All-American wide receiver Calvin Johnson to two receptions and 13 yards, while also breaking up three passes and intercepting a pass.

Chick-fil-A Bowl 

When Neil Callaway, Georgia's offensive coordinator from 2001 to 2006, left at the end of 2006 to become the head coach at University of Alabama at Birmingham, Richt named Mike Bobo as the new offensive coordinator; Bobo had already taken over the play-calling duties from Richt starting with the Georgia Tech game. He debuted as coordinator for the 2006 Chick-fil-A Bowl against Virginia Tech.

In the bowl game, Virginia Tech jumped out to a 21–3 halftime lead, scoring on two one-yard touchdowns from tailback Brandon Ore and a 53-yard pass from flanker Eddie Royal to tight end Sam Wheeler.  In the second half, Georgia scored 28 unanswered points and held off a late Tech rally to win 31–24.

Source:

Statistics

Team

Scores by quarter

Offense

Rushing

Passing

Receiving

Defense

Special teams

Kicking

Returns

Field Goals

Postseason

Final ranking 
Georgia's victories over ranked opponents its final three games of the 2006 season allowed the Bulldogs to regain a spot in the final AP Poll.  The Georgia Bulldogs completed 2006 ranked number 23 in the final AP poll.  Georgia has finished in the top 25 in each of Richt's six seasons as head coach.

Post-season all-star games 
Mark Richt and ten Georgia players were invited to post-season all-star games.
Defensive tackle Ray Gant played in the North–South All-Star Classic on January 13, 2007.
Coach Richt served an assistant coach in the Hula Bowl game played on January 14, 2007 for the victorious East (Aina) squad. 
Center Nick Jones played in the Hula Bowl.
Punter Gordon Ely-Kelso played in the Hula Bowl.
Linebacker Danny Verdun Wheeler played in the Hula Bowl. 
Linebacker Jarvis Jackson was to play in the canceled Las Vegas Bowl on January 15, 2007.
Offensive lineman Daniel Inman played in the Las Vegas Bowl. 
Rover Tra Battle played in the Las Vegas Bowl.
Tight end Martrez Milner played in the Senior Bowl on January 27, 2007.
Defensive end Quentin Moses played in the Senior Bowl.
Linebacker Tony Taylor played in the Senior Bowl.

References 

Georgia
Georgia Bulldogs football seasons
Peach Bowl champion seasons
Georgia Bulldogs football